This is a filmography of Nassar, an Indian actor, director, dubbing artist and playback singer.

As an actor

Films

Tamil

Telugu

Bengali

Malayalam 

 Mukham (1990)	.... Narendran
 Dhanam (1991)
 Gazal (1993) .... Valiyamaliyekkal Syed Burhanudeen Thangal
 Butterflies (1993) .... Colonel Devan Nambiar
 Guru (1997)
 Kulam (1997)
 Rakthasakshikal Zindabad (1998)  as  Diwan Sir C.P. Ramaswami
 Olympian Anthony Adam (1999) .... Roy Mamman / Lawrence Luther
 Sathyam Sivam Sundaram (2000) as Indraraja Reddy
 Agninakshathram (2004)
 Made in USA (2005)
 Udayon (2005) .... Unni Vaidyan
 Pachamarathanalil (2008) .... C.I. Venkatachala Iyer
 Ideal Couple (2012)
 Kochi (2012)
 Dracula 2012 (2013)
 Geethanjali (2013) .... Kathalikaattu Thirumeni
 Charlie (2015) .... Street Magician ('Cameo')
 Kattumakkan (2016)
 Aadupuliyattam (2016)
 Happy Birthday (2016)
 Shyam (2016)
 Aby (2017)
 Aabhaasam (2018) as a policeman
 Abhiyude Katha Anuvinteyum (2018)
 Aabhaasam (2018)
 My Story (2018) .... Keshava Perumal (Cameo)
 Neerali (2018) .... George (Cameo)
Erida (2021)
Pathonpatham Noottandu (2022) .... Kalliseril Perumal Chekavar

Kannada 

 Veera Bhadra (1985)
 Ravana Rajya (1987)
 Underworld (1999)
 Dhumm (2002) .... Shankar
 News (2005) ... Devaraj, editor of newspaper Number 1
 Cyanide (2006)
 Mohini 9886788888 (2006)
 Ajay (2006)
 Bindaas (2008) .... ACP Vikram Rathod, Preethi's father
 Suryakaanti (2010)
 Tamassu (2010) .... Nassar Baba
 Olave Mandara (2011)
 Bachchan (2013) .... Dr. Srinivasa Iyengar
 Brahma (2014) .... Veer Bramha
 Kotigobba 2 (2016) .... Commissioner Sharathkumar
 Bannada Neralu (2017)
 Victory 2 (2018)

Hindi 

 Angrakshak (1995)
 Criminal (1995) .... Inspector Teja
 Chachi 420 (1997) .... Siraj / Pandit Shivraj Sharma Kaveri
 Hey Ram (2000) .... Police Officer
 Little John (2001) .... Inspector Vijay
 Phir Milenge (2004) .... Lawyer
 Nishabd (2007) .... Shridhar
 Firaaq (2008) .... Grave Digger  
 Rowdy Rathore (2012) .... Baapji
 Jayantabhai Ki Luv Story (2013) .... Alex Pandian
 D-Day (2013) .... Ashwini Rao
 David (2013) ... Father Noel
 Ramaiya Vastavaiya (2013) ... Jayprakash
 Kamasutra 3D (2013) 
 Saala Khadoos (2016) ... Punch Pandian
 Tutak Tutak Tutiya (2016) ... spirit priest
 The Ghazi Attack (2017) .... Vice Admiral Indian Navy (K. T. Raman)
 Article 15 (2019) .... CBI Officer Panikar
 Marjaavaan (2019) .... Anna
 Serious Men (2020) .... Dr. Arvind Acharya (Netflix original)
 Thalaivii (2021) ....M. Karunanidhi
 Dobaaraa (2022) .....Dr. Sethupathi
 Ram Setu (2022).....Indrakant

English 
 Tales of The Kama Sutra: The Perfumed Garden (2000)
 Little John (2001) .... Inspector Vijay
 Nothing But Life (2004)
 Morning Raga (2004) .... Abhinay's father
 Quick Gun Murugan (2009) .... Rice Plate Reddy
 Fair Game (2010) .... Mr. Tabir
 Minor New Minute (2011)

Television

Web series

As director

As dubbing artist

 1987 – Manathil Uruthi Vendum – Chandrakanth
 1989 - Idhuthanda Police - Rami Reddy (Tamil version)
 1990 - Vyjayanthi IPS - A. Pundarikakshaiah (Tamil version)
 1990 - Ulagam Piranthadhu Enakkaga - Rami Reddy
 1991 - Shanti Enathu Shanti - Chakravarthy 
 1993 - Evana Irundha Enakenna - Padhire Krishna Reddy (Tamil version)
 1993 - Captain Magal - Napoleon
 1995 - The King - Murali (Tamil version)
 1996 – Indian – Nedumudi Venu (Tamil Version)
 1997 - Devaraagam - Narendra Prasad (Tamil version)
 1998 - Uyire - Sabyasachi Chakraborty (Tamil version)
 2001 – Aalavandhan  – Milind Gunaji (Tamil Version)
 2003 – Magic Magic 3D – Al Dioro
 2007 – Guru – Mithun Chakraborty (Tamil Version)
 2008 – Vaazhthugal – Na. Muthusamy
 2010 - Chutti Chathan - Dalip Tahil (Tamil version)
 2012 – Prince of Persia – Ben Kingsley (Tamil Version)
 2016 – The BFG – Mark Rylance (Tamil Version)
 2017 – Vikram Vedha – Narrator
 2017 – Theeran Adhigaaram Ondru – Ending Voiceover
 2021 – Squid Game – O Yeong-su  (Tamil Version)
 2023 – Farzi – (Tamil Version)

As playback singer

Accolades

Tamil Nadu State Film Awards

 1992 – Tamil Nadu State Film Award Special Prize – Aavarampoo
 2002 – Tamil Nadu State Film Award for Best Villain – Thamizh
 2006 – Tamil Nadu State Film Award for Best Character Artiste (Male) – Em Magan
 2011 – Tamil Nadu State Film Award for Best Character Artiste (Male) – Deiva Thirumagal
 2014 – Tamil Nadu State Film Award for Best Character Artiste (Male) – Kaaviya Thalaivan

Ananda Vikatan Cinema Awards

 2008 – Ananda Vikatan Cinema Award for Best comedian – Poi Solla Porom

Norway Tamil Film Festival Awards

 2014 – Norway Tamil Film Festival Award for Best Supporting Actor – Kaaviya Thalaivan

 Nandi Awards

 Nandi Award for Best Villain - Chanti

References

Indian filmographies
Male actor filmographies
Director filmographies